Fengtai District is a district of the municipality of Beijing. It lies mostly to the southwest of the city center, extending into the city's southwestern suburbs beyond the Sixth Ring Road, but also to the south and, to a smaller extent, the southeast, where it has borders with Chaoyang District and Dongcheng District.

History
The Western Han dynasty Prince Liu Jian and his wife were buried in Dabaotai village in southwestern Fengtai over 2,000 years ago.  The tombs were discovered in 1974 and are now open to visitors at the Dabaotai Western Han Dynasty Mausoleum on Fengbo Road.

In Qing Dynasty times, Fengtai was where the Imperial Manchu Army had its camps, trained, and held parades on festive occasions.

It is divided into 14 subdistricts of the city proper of Beijing, 2 towns, and 5 townships (2 of which are suburbs of the city proper of Beijing). This precinct is newly urbanized in comparison to those precincts in the old city, and until the mid-1980s, it was still a mostly rural area where pig pens and goat pens were common, and major parts of the precinct had no electricity.  It was only during the recent rapid economic development that the precinct was urbanized.  Its postal code is 100071.

Changxindian (population 78,092) and Yungang (population 32,894) Subdistricts of Beijing make up an urban area distinct from Beijing.

Administrative divisions
As of 2020, the district administers 14 subdistricts, 3 townships, 2 areas with subdistrict status, and 2 towns:

In 2021, Fengtai District was reorganized into 26 subdivisions, notably removing Lugouqiao and Nayuan Areas, adding Chengshousi, Shiliuzhuang, Yuquanying, Kandan, Wulidian and Qingta Subdistricts, as well as renaming Lugouqiao Subdistrict and Changxindian Town to Liuliqiao Subdistrict and Beigong Town respectively.

Notable communities
 Zhejiangcun

Transportation

The southwestern stretches of the 2nd, 3rd, 4th, 5th and 6th Ring Roads all run through the district, as well as the Jingshi Expressway (Jingzhu Expressway).

Railway stations
Beijing West railway station and Beijing South railway station are both located in the northeastern part of Fengtai, near its border with Xicheng District. Beijing Fengtai railway station opened in 2022.

Metro
Fengtai is currently served by twelve metro lines of the Beijing Subway:
  - Beijing South railway station , Majiapu, Jiaomen West , Gongyixiqiao 
  - Puhuangyu , Liujiayao, Songjiazhuang   
  - Beijing West railway station 
  (S) - Muxiyuan, Haihutun, Dahongmen South, Heyi, Donggaodi, Huojianwanyuan
   - Beijing West railway station , Liuliqiao East, Liuliqiao , Qilizhuang , Fengtai Dongdajie, Fengtainanlu, Keyilu, Fengtai Science Park, Guogongzhuang 
  - Fenzhongsi, Songjiazhuang  , Shiliuzhuang, Dahongmen, Jiaomen East, Jiaomen West , Caoqiao , Jijiamiao, Shoujingmao, Fengtai railway station, Niwa, Xiju , Liuliqiao 
  (W) - Zhangguozhuang, Garden Expo Park, Dawayao, Guozhuangzi, Dajing, Qilizhuang , Xiju 
  (E) - Beijing South railway station , Puhuangyu , Fangzhuang
  - Gongyixiqiao , Xingong
  - Guogongzhuang , Dabaotai
  - Songjiazhuang  
  -

Tourism
Beijing World Park
White Cloud Temple
Marco Polo Bridge
Wanping Fortress, at the eastern end of the bridge
Museum of the War of Chinese People's Resistance Against Japanese Aggression, inside the fortress

Economy
In 2017, the regional GDP of the district is 142.75 billion yuan, with GDP per capita at 65.3 thousand yuan.

China United Airlines previously had its headquarters in Fengtai District. Okay Airways previously had its headquarters in Fengtai District.

Education

Capital Medical University and Capital University of Economics and Business are located in this district.

Climate 

Fengtai has a humid continental climate (Köppen climate classification Dwa).

References

Notes

General references

 Harper, Damian, Beijing: City Guide, 7th Edition, Oakland, California: Lonely Planet Publications, 2007. Cf. pp. 96–98, 138, 266–267.
 Harper, Damian, Beijing: City Guide, 6th Edition, Oakland, California : Lonely Planet Publications, 2005. . Cf. section beginning on p. 88, "Fengtai & Xuanwu".

External links

 
 Fengtai District, Beijing Municipality 

 
Districts of Beijing